The zhang is a customary Chinese unit of length equal to 10 chi (Chinese feet). Its value varied over time and place with different values of the chi, although it was occasionally standardized. In 1915, the Republic of China set it equal to about 3.2meters or 3.50yards. In 1930, this was revised to an exact value of 3⅓meters (about 3.645yd).

It is not commonly used in mainland China today but appears in traditional Chinese architecture, where it was commonly used to measure bays.

See also
 Chinese units of measurement

Customary units of measurement
Units of length
Standards of the People's Republic of China

References